St. Andrews University may refer to:
St. Andrews University (Japan)
St. Andrews University (North Carolina)
Saint Andrew the First-Called Georgian University of the Patriarchate of Georgia, in Tbilisi, Georgia
University of St Andrews, in Scotland

See also
Andrews University
Andrew College